Petipa or Petipas is a French surname, which may refer to:

People
 Jean-Antoine Petipa (1787–1855), French ballet dancer
 Lucien Petipa (1815–1898), French ballet dancer, son of Jean-Antoine Petipa
 Marius Petipa (1818–1910), French ballet dancer and choreographer
 Mariia Surovshchikova-Petipa (1836–1882), Russian ballet dancer, first wife of Marius
 Marie Petipa (1857–1930), Russian ballet dancer, daughter of Marius and Maria
 Marius Petipa-2 (ru: Петипа, Мариус Мариусович) (1850–1919), Russian theatre actor and son of Marius Petipa
 Lidya Petipa (ru: Петипа, Лидия Петровна) (died 1914/1915), Russian actress and wife of Marius Petipa-2 (ru: Петипа, Мариус Мариусович)
 Nikolai Radin (1872–1935), Russian actor and son of Marius Petipa-2 (ru: Петипа, Мариус Мариусович) and Мария Казанкова
 Viktor Petipa (ru: Петипа, Виктор Мариусович) (1878–1933) Russian actor and son of Marius Petipa and his second wife Lubov Savitskaya (ru: Савицкая, Любовь Леонидовна)
 Mariy Petipa (ru: Петипа, Марий Мариусович) (1884–1922) Russian actor and son of Marius Petipa and his second wife Lubov Savitskaya (Савицкая, Любовь Леонидовна)

Other uses
 Prudence Petitpas, a Belgian comics series